Sciota is an unincorporated community in Hamilton Township in Monroe County, Pennsylvania, United States. Sciota is located near the interchange between the southern terminus of U.S. Route 209 Business and U.S. Route 209.

References

Unincorporated communities in Monroe County, Pennsylvania
Unincorporated communities in Pennsylvania